Negrão is a surname. Notable people with the surname include:

Alexandre Sarnes Negrão (born 1985), Brazilian entrepreneur and race car driver
André Negrão (born 1992), Brazilian racing driver
Fernando Negrão (born 1955), Portuguese jurist and politician
Júnior Negrão (born 1986), Brazilian footballer
Marcelo Negrão (born 1972), Brazilian volleyball player
Mário Negrão (born 1945), Brazilian composer, drummer and percussionist